Mutaib (Arabic: متعب) is a masculine given name of Arabic origin. Notable people with the name are as follows:

 Mutaib Alsaqar (1959–2021), Jordanian singer
 Mutaib bin Abdullah Al Rashid (died 1869), ruler of the Emirate of Jabal Shammar
 Mutaib bin Abdulaziz Al Saud (1931–2019), Saudi royal and politician
 Mutaib bin Abdullah Al Saud (born 1952), Saudi royal, military official and politician

Arabic masculine given names